Dennis van der Heijden (born 17 February 1997) is a Dutch professional footballer who plays for as a forward for VV Capelle. He has played for the Netherlands U20 national football team.

He scored twice on his professional debut for ADO Den Haag but failed to score again in the Eredivisie over the next year and half. As a result he spent the remainder of his second season with the club on loan at Volendam before signing a permanent deal with fellow Eerste Divisie side Almere City at the end of the season. There he spent a further season before relocating to Italy to join Carpi in 2018.

Club career

ADO Den Haag
Van der Heijden made his debut for ADO Den Haag on 14 February 2016 against Excelsior. He was brought on as substitute for Vito Wormgoor in the 77th minute, with Den Haag trailing 2–1, and scored twice to help the club complete a 4–2 come-from-behind victory. In doing so he became the first player to net a brace for the club on debut since Dmitri Bulykin in 2010. On 24 March, van der Heijden signed his first professional contract, signing a three-and-a-half-year deal. He ended the season with nine appearances and two goals to his name as The Hague finished 11th in the Eredivisie. On 17 June, van der Heijden was named runner-up for ADO Den Haag's Goal of the Season award for his goal against Excelsior, losing out by 4% to club goalkeeper Martin Hansen.

Loan to Volendam
Van Der Heijden scored his first goal of the season on his KNVB Cup debut in a 2–1 win over Telstar on 25 October 2016, coming off the bench to score the winner in the 81st minute of the match. He failed to score in 16 Eredivisie appearances by January though, and at the end of the month was loaned to Eerste Divisie side Volendam. He made his debut for the club on 3 February 2017, starting in a 3–1 loss to Emmen and scored his first goal ten days later, netting Volendam's opener in a 4–2 win over Utrecht II. He ultimately made 9 appearances for the season and scored 3 goals as Volendam were defeated in the promotion play-offs by NAC Breda.

Almere City FC
On 31 August 2017, van der Heijden signed a one-year contract with Eerste Divisie side Almere City. He scored his first goals for the club on 22 September, netting a second-half brace to earn Almere a 2–2 come-from-behind draw with Oss. He ultimately recorded a return of seven goals for the league campaign in what proved to be his only season with Almere.

Carpi
On 3 July 2018, van der Heijden signed a four-year contract with Italian side, Carpi. On 22 June 2021 he left the club by mutual agreement.

Loan to Fermana
On 31 January 2019, he joined Fermana on loan until the end of the 2018–19 season.

Loan to TOP Oss
On 31 January 2020, he returned to the Netherlands, joining TOP Oss on loan until the end of the season. The deal was extended for an extra season in August 2020.

Chrobry Głogów
On 24 June 2021, Van der Heijden signed with Polish club Chrobry Głogów.

VV Capelle
Following the conclusion of the 2021–22 season, van der Heijden returned to Holland to join Vierde Divisie side VV Capelle.

International career

Netherlands national youth teams
Following his breakthrough with ADO Den Haag earlier in the preceding league campaign, van der Heijden was named in Aron Winter's side for the U19 European Championship. He made his debut for the Netherlands U19 side in their opening match of the tournament on 12 July, coming on as a late substitute for Steven Bergwijn in a 3–1 win over Croatia. He scored his first goal for the U19's in Netherlands' final match at the tournament, which ultimately ended in a penalty-shootout loss against Germany which saw them fail to qualify for the 2017 FIFA U-20 World Cup.

On 7 October 2016, van der Heijden scored four goals for Netherlands U20 in a 5–3 win over the United States in a Four Nations Tournament.

Career statistics

References

External links

 

1997 births
Living people
Dutch footballers
Dutch expatriate footballers
Netherlands youth international footballers
Association football forwards
Eredivisie players
Eerste Divisie players
Footballers from Schiedam
ADO Den Haag players
FC Volendam players
Almere City FC players
A.C. Carpi players
Fermana F.C. players
TOP Oss players
Chrobry Głogów players
VV Capelle players
Serie C players
I liga players
Dutch expatriate sportspeople in Italy
Expatriate footballers in Italy
Expatriate footballers in Poland
Dutch expatriate sportspeople in Poland